Olivier Tia Tokbe (born 22 December 1982) is an Ivorian footballer who plays as a forward for Sudanese side Al-Merrikh.

External links 
Allafrica.com article

1982 births
Ivorian footballers
Ivorian expatriate footballers
Expatriate footballers in Qatar
Association football forwards
Expatriate footballers in Tunisia
Ivorian expatriate sportspeople in Tunisia
Belgian Pro League players
Association football midfielders
K.S.K. Beveren players
Living people
Olympique Béja players
Ajman Club players
Fujairah FC players
Ivorian expatriate sportspeople in Qatar
Al Ahli SC (Doha) players
Expatriate footballers in Belgium
Expatriate footballers in Sudan
Al-Merrikh SC players
Qatar Stars League players
UAE Pro League players
Sportkring Sint-Niklaas players